Wilkie D. Ferguson Jr. (known as Arena/State Plaza before 2012) is a Metromover station in Downtown, Miami, Florida.

This station is located near the intersection of Northwest Fifth Street and First Avenue. It opened to service April 17, 1986. This station is within walking distance to MiamiCentral, which serves Brightline.

Station layout

Places of interest
Wilkie D. Ferguson U.S. District Courthouse
U.S. Post Office
Miami Police Department
MiamiCentral
City of Miami Office Building
Florida State Office Buildings
New Arena Square
101 Fifth Street Building
121 Fifth Street Building
141 Fifth Street Building
120 Fifth Street Building
Crosswinds Office Building

References

External links
 
 MDT – Metromover Stations
 1st Avenue entrance from Google Maps Street View

Metromover stations
Railway stations in the United States opened in 1986
1986 establishments in Florida
Brickell Loop
Inner Loop
Omni Loop